Esquelbecq (from ) is a commune in the Nord department in northern France.

Its southern limit with Ledringhem is chemin de Rubrouck.

Heraldry

History 
In 1436, Wautier de Ghistelles was seigneur d'Ekelsbeke et de Ledringhem (Lord of Esquelbecq and Ledringhem) and governor of La Madeleine hospital in Bierne.

The Wormhoudt massacre was perpetrated near Esquelbecq on 80 British and French prisoners of war by Waffen-SS members at the time of the Dunkirk evacuation in 1940.

Church and organ 
The church on the village square is dedicated to Folcwin, who died at Esquelbecq in 855 CE. It is a hall church of the hallekerk type characteristic of the region, with three naves of equal length, width, and height. The interior and roof were destroyed by a fire in 1976, but the external appearance is still substantially as it was in 1610, with an attractive lozenge pattern in the brickwork.

The present church organ, by Marc Garnier (who also built an organ for the Elgar Concert Hall at the University of Birmingham), was built after the fire. It is modelled on the designs prevalent in Flanders in the 17th century and is "mesotonic" – tuned so that pieces from that era can be played in meantone temperament.

Transportation 

Esquelbecq is served by a railway station.

See also 
 Communes of the Nord department

References 

Communes of Nord (French department)
French Flanders